Mohakhali is a neighborhood of Dhaka city, the capital of Bangladesh.

Events 

Korail Slum is located in Mohakhali. In December 2016 a fire destroyed over 500 shanty homes in the slum. In December the Saat Tola slum which is also located in the slum caught fire.

External links

References 

Dhaka
Neighbourhoods in Bangladesh